Road 45 is a road in Bushehr Province and Khuzestan Province of coastal southwestern Iran. 

It connects Bandar Deylam and the Persian Gulf Coastal Road to Ramhormoz and the Ahvaz-Esfahan Road via Behbahan.

References

External links 

 Iran road map on Young Journalists Club

45
Transportation in Bushehr Province
Transportation in Khuzestan Province